Buried treasure is a literary trope commonly associated with depictions of pirates, vikings, criminals, and Old West outlaws. According to popular conception, these people often buried their stolen fortunes in remote places, intending to return to them later (often with the use of a pirates treasure map).

Pirates
Pirates burying treasure was rare.  The only pirate known to have actually buried treasure was William Kidd, who is believed to have buried at least some of his wealth on Gardiners Island near Long Island before sailing into New York City. Kidd had originally been commissioned as a privateer for England, but his behavior had strayed into outright piracy, and he hoped that his treasure could serve as a bargaining chip in negotiations to avoid punishment. His bid was unsuccessful, however, and Kidd was hanged as a pirate.

In English fiction there are three well-known stories that helped to popularize the myth of buried pirate treasure: Wolfert Webber (1824) by Washington Irving, The Gold-Bug (1843) by Edgar Allan Poe and Treasure Island (1883) by Robert Louis Stevenson. These stories differ widely in plot and literary treatment but are all based on the William Kidd legend. David Cordingly states that "The effect of Treasure Island on our perception of pirates cannot be overestimated," and says the idea of treasure maps leading to buried treasure "is an entirely fictional device." Stevenson's Treasure Island was directly influenced by Irving's Wolfert Webber, Stevenson saying in his preface, "It is my debt to Washington Irving that exercises my conscience, and justly so, for I believe plagiarism was rarely carried farther... the whole inner spirit and a good deal of the material detail of my first chapters... were the property of Washington Irving."

In 1911, American author Ralph D. Paine conducted a survey of all known or purported stories of buried treasure and published them in The Book of Buried Treasure. He found a common trait in all the stories: there was always a lone survivor of a piratical crew who somehow preserved a chart showing where the treasure was buried, but unable to return himself, he transfers the map or information to a friend or shipmate, usually on his deathbed. This person would then go search in vain for the treasure, but not before transferring the legend down to another hapless seeker.

Cases
The Roman historian Dio Cassius says that, in the early 2nd century, the Dacian king Decebalus had changed the course of river Sargetia and buried tons of gold and silver in the river bed.  Later, he ordered the river to be restored and the slaves involved in the works to be executed.  However, one of his nobles revealed the treasure's location to the Romans.  The Byzantine historian Jordanes tells a similar story of the burial of the Visigoth king Alaric I and his treasure under the river Busento in 410.  The burial places of the Khazar kings (qoruq) and other inner Asian people were also under a rerouted river.

There are a number of reports of supposed buried pirate treasure that surfaced much earlier than these works, which indicates that the idea was at least around for more than a century before those stories were published. For example, extensive excavation has taken place on Oak Island (in Nova Scotia) since 1795 in the belief that one or more pirate captains had hidden large amounts of valuables there. These excavations were said to have been prompted by still older legends of buried pirate treasure in the area. No treasure has yet been reported found.

The Treasure of Lima is a supposed buried treasure on Cocos Island in the Pacific abandoned by pirates. The treasure, estimated to be worth £160 million, was stolen by British Captain William Thompson in 1820 after he was entrusted to transport it from Peru to Mexico.

The only authenticated treasure chest in the United States, once owned by Thomas Tew, is kept at the Pirate Soul Museum in St. Augustine, Florida.

Pirate Olivier Levasseur, also known as "The Buzzard" (La Buse), was rumoured to have hidden treasure before his death in 1730. No such treasure has been found.

During the 1666 Great Fire of London, wealthy residents of the city buried luxury goods such as gold and wine in the ground to protect it from the raging flames above. Samuel Pepys, the noted diarist, buried a wheel of cheese in his garden to protect it from the fire.

Buried treasure is not the same as a hoard, of which there have been thousands of examples found by archaeologists and metal detectors. Buried treasure is as much a cultural concept as an objective thing. It is related to pirates and other criminals who leave stolen artifacts behind for later retrieval, typically in remote places like islands, sometimes with maps leading back to the treasure.

The Fenn treasure was reportedly buried by millionaire Forrest Fenn around 2010 and found in 2020, somewhere in Wyoming.

See also
 Chest (furniture)
 List of missing treasures
 Treasure of Guarrazar
 Oak Island

References

Treasure
Pirate treasure
Treasure